The women's team sprint in the 2015–16 ISU Speed Skating World Cup was contested over four races, out of a total of six World Cup occasions for the season, with the first occasion taking place in Calgary, Alberta, Canada, on 14 November 2015, and the final occasion taking place in Heerenveen, Netherlands, on 11 March 2016.

The team sprint was a new event for the season. China won two out of four races and the inaugural classification.

Top three

Race medallists 

Note: the races are over 3 laps.

Standings

References 

 
Women team sprint